Cat-Women of the Moon is an independently made 1953 American black-and-white three-dimensional science-fiction film, produced by Jack Rabin and Al Zimbalist, directed by Arthur Hilton, that stars Sonny Tufts, Victor Jory, and Marie Windsor. The film was released by Astor Pictures.

Notably, the musical score was composed by Academy Award–winner Elmer Bernstein, though his last name is misspelled as "Bernstien" in the opening credits.

Plot
Utilizing a spaceship equipped with wooden tables and chairs, a "scientific expedition" to the Moon encounters a race of cat-women, the last survivors of a two-million-year-old lunar civilization. Residing deep within a Moon cavern, the cat-women have managed to maintain not only the remnants of a breathable atmosphere and Earth-like gravity, but also a pair of gigantic Moon-spiders. The cat-women wear black unitards, have beehive hairstyles, and wear elaborate cosmetics. Realizing that their remaining atmosphere will soon be exhausted, the cat-women plan to steal the expedition's spaceship and return to Earth, where, in the words of the cat-women's leader, Alpha (Carol Brewster), "We will get their women under our power, and soon we will rule the whole world!"

Through the use of their telepathic abilities, the cat-women have been subliminally controlling Helen Salinger (Marie Windsor), the mission navigator and only female member of the Earth expedition. Once on the Moon, the cat-women take control of Helen's mind, after which she leads the entire crew (clad in spacesuits and equipped with matches, cigarettes, and a gun) to the cat-women's cavern. Although unable to directly control male minds, the cat-women are able to influence the male crew through Helen, using their own superior intellectual abilities and feminine wiles. As explained to Helen by the cat-woman Beta (Suzanne Alexander), "Show us their weak points. We'll take care of the rest."

Along with telepathy, the cat-women can transport themselves, unseen and instantly, from place-to-place within the cavern. They use this ability to steal the crew's unguarded spacesuits, which forces the crew deeper into the cavern and into violent confrontations with the two Moon-spiders and the cat-women. Failing to exterminate the men, the cat-women approach them openly, using Helen to help establish friendly relations. Kip (Victor Jory), who has been suspicious of the cat-women, confronts Alpha about the missing spacesuits; she promises to return the suits in the morning. Food and drink are then brought, and private conversations between both groups begin. As these progress ("You're too smart for me, baby. I like 'em stupid"), the gun-wielding Kip sits alone, unable to intervene, while the cat-women successfully manipulate the "weak points" of expedition commander Laird (Sonny Tufts) and the other men.

By that evening, the cat-women have learned how to pilot the spaceship. Following a modern dance performance by the cat-women, Walt (Douglas Fowley) is stabbed to death by Beta. Lambda (Susan Morrow) has fallen in love with crew member Doug (William Phipps) and tells him of the cat-woman plot, saying, "I love you Doug, and I must kill you". The male crew now realizes they are in danger. Carrying three spacesuits, Alpha, Beta, and Helen run toward the spaceship. Lambda teleports ahead to delay them and is bludgeoned to death by Beta. Kip catches up and fires several shots, killing Alpha and Beta but leaving Helen uninjured. The surviving expedition members escape the cavern, reach the spaceship, and return to Earth.

Cast
 Sonny Tufts as Laird Grainger
 Victor Jory as Kip Reissner
 Marie Windsor as Helen Salinger
 William Phipps as Doug Smith
 Douglas Fowley as Walt Walters
 Carol Brewster as Alpha
 Suzanne Alexander as Beta (credited as Suzann Alexander)
 Susan Morrow as Lambda
 Bette Arlen as Cat-Woman
 Roxann Delman as Cat-Woman
 Ellye Marshall as Cat-Woman
 Judy Walsh as Cat-Woman

Reception and legacy
Upon the film's release, Variety magazine wrote: "This imaginatively conceived and produced science-fiction yarn [an original story by producers Zimbalist and Rabin] takes the earth-to-moon premise and embellishes it with a civilization of cat-women on the moon ... Cast ably portray their respective roles ... Arthur Hilton makes his direction count in catching the spirit of the theme, and art direction is far above average for a film of this calibre. William Whitley's 3-D photography provides the proper eerie quality".

The New York Times wrote: "They (the Cat-women) try to get their hands on the visitors' rocket ship, hoping to come down here and hypnotize us all. Considering the delegation that went up, it's hard to imagine why".

The Encyclopedia of Science Fiction calls the film absurd, but notes that it "qualifies as one of the most influential science-fiction films ever made" as it influenced later low budget films "in which astronauts discover decadent, all-female (or almost all-female) civilizations on other planets, including Fire Maidens from Outer Space (1956), Missile to the Moon (1958), Queen of Outer Space (1958), Nude on the Moon (1961), [and] Voyage to the Planet of Prehistoric Women (1968)."

Cat-Women of the Moon inspired several songs on Shakespears Sister's 1992 album Hormonally Yours, among them their UK number-one hit "Stay". It was also spoofed by RiffTrax with Mary Jo Pehl and Bridget Nelson on April 15, 2016.

See also
 List of films featuring extraterrestrials

References

Bibliography
Warren, Bill. Keep Watching the Skies: American Science Fiction Films of the Fifties, 21st Century Edition (a greatly expanded 2nd edition, now a single large oversize illustrated volume, with an introduction by science fiction writer Howard Waldrop). 1024 pages. Jefferson, North Carolina: McFarland & Company, 2009 (original 1st edition 1982). .

External links

 

 
 Mexican lobby card for Spanish-language version of the film

1953 films
1953 3D films
1950s science fiction films
1950s monster movies
American 3D films
American black-and-white films
American science fiction films
American monster movies
Films scored by Elmer Bernstein
Films about astronauts
Films about spiders
Moon in film
Films directed by Arthur Hilton
Astor Pictures films
Single-gender worlds
1950s English-language films
1950s American films
English-language science fiction films